Tom Clancy's Splinter Cell is a series of stealth action-adventure video games, the first of which was released in 2002, and their tie-in novels that were endorsed by Tom Clancy. The series follows Sam Fisher, a highly trained agent of a fictional black-ops sub-division within the NSA, dubbed "Third Echelon", as he overcomes his adversaries. Levels are created using Unreal Engine and emphasize light and darkness as gameplay elements. The series has been positively received, and was once considered to be one of Ubisoft's flagship franchises, selling more than 31 million copies by 2011. No further installments have been released since 2013, though a VR version and a remake of the first game have since been announced.

Games

Tom Clancy's Splinter Cell (2002)

Tom Clancy's Splinter Cell was developed over a period of two years and developed by Ubisoft Montreal with original publishing by Microsoft Game Studios for the Xbox as an exclusive title. Later in 2003, Ubisoft ported the game to Microsoft Windows, Mac, PlayStation 2, GameCube, and Game Boy Advance. Inspired by the Metal Gear series, it uses an Unreal Engine 2 that was modified to allow light-and-dark based gameplay.

Tom Clancy's Splinter Cell: Pandora Tomorrow (2004)

Pandora Tomorrow was developed by Ubisoft Shanghai and Ubisoft Milan and introduced multiplayer gameplay to the series. In single-player mode, the game AI adapts to adjust to the player's skill level. Unlike other games in the series, which generally lean towards information-based threats, the plot of Pandora Tomorrow focuses on biological warfare, in which an Indonesian terrorist group threatens to infect people with the smallpox virus. Fisher is also given new abilities like SWAT turns and whistling to attract enemies' attention.

Tom Clancy's Splinter Cell: Chaos Theory (2005)

Ubisoft Montreal and Ubisoft Milan were again responsible for the third game in the series, Chaos Theory. It adds a cooperative multiplayer mode. Originally announced to be released in Fall 2004, its initial releases were made at the end of March 2005. The Unreal Engine was heavily modified, this time from version 2.5. The game includes a number of new features, including adding a combat knife to the player's inventory. Maps are also more open with multiple ways of achieving the end goal.

Tom Clancy's Splinter Cell: Essentials (2006)

Essentials extends the Splinter Cell series to the PSP platform. Through a series of flashback missions, the player learns more about Fisher's backstory. The game was less positively received critically than previous installments, with criticism aimed at the control mechanics and the multiplayer mode.

Tom Clancy's Splinter Cell: Double Agent (2006)

For the series' fourth installment, Double Agent, two separate versions were created, one for generation six consoles and the Wii, and the other for Xbox 360, Microsoft Windows, and PlayStation 3. Double Agent features a "trust system" that presents the player with moral dilemmas. It is the first game in the series with a hub-like area, where Sam can explore and do objectives between missions. This is also the only game in the series to have different endings based on player decisions, but only one ending is considered canon.

Tom Clancy's Splinter Cell: Conviction (2010)

Conviction was officially announced on May 23, 2007, when Ubisoft released a trailer for the game. The game was due for release on November 16, 2007. However, the game missed its initial launch date, and on May 19, 2008, it was reported that Conviction was "officially on hold" and that the game had been taken "back to the drawing board". Ubisoft announced that the game had been pushed back to the 2009–10 fiscal year. At E3 2009, the developers confirmed that the "new" Conviction had been in development since early 2008, commenting that "the gameplay has evolved a lot" and "the visual direction is simply much better". The game's release date was pushed back several times. On March 18, 2010, the demo was released for Xbox 360. Ubisoft wanted to make the fifth game more accessible, so Conviction was designed around the new core elements "Mark and Execute" and "Last Known Position", while stealth elements present in the previous games were omitted, such as the ability to whistle, lock pick, and hide bodies. Conviction uses a cover system and adds simple interrogation sequences to the series.

Tom Clancy's Splinter Cell: Blacklist (2013)

Blacklist is the sixth installment in the series, developed by Ubisoft Toronto and was released on August 20, 2013. Blacklist boasts new features combining gameplay from Chaos Theory and Conviction. Series veteran Michael Ironside was replaced in his role as Sam Fisher by actor Eric Johnson. In the game, Fisher has been appointed as the commander of the new "Fourth Echelon", a clandestine unit that answers solely to the President of the United States. She has denied any existence of the agency and Fourth Echelon is working to stop a new terror plot, known as the 'Blacklist'. Fourth Echelon also has the secondary objective of stopping all operations in which Third Echelon is still running. Features returning include a moving "Mark and Execute", Fisher's signature goggles and a new knife, the Karambit, and the ability to perform "abduction" stealth melee takedowns.

Future
At E3 2017 regarding Splinter Cell, Ubisoft CEO Yves Guillemot stated: "I can't say much about that. But, for sure, all the Clancy games are taken care of. It's just we have quite a lot on our plate at the moment...[A]ll the Clancy games are really coming along, so we are not forgetting Splinter Cell." Later in an Ask Me Anything Reddit post, he stated: "We don't have anything specific to share at the moment but teams are working on different things, so stay tuned for more."

In May 2019, Julian Gerighty, Ubisoft Creative Director, announced on their social media page that a game is currently in development. In his statement, he said he had been working on the game with Ubisoft Montreal creative director, Roman Campos-Oriola, and executive producer Dan Hay. However, Ubisoft later disputed this.

On September 16, 2020, it was announced at Facebook Connect that a virtual reality version of the series is coming exclusively to the Oculus VR platform, along with an Assassin's Creed game. They are set to be developed by Red Storm Entertainment. On July 21, 2022, the VR Splinter Cell game was cancelled.

In December 2021, Ubisoft revealed that they are working on a remake of the first game. In October 2022, David Grivel, the director of the game, left Ubisoft.

Novels

Tom Clancy's Splinter Cell (2004)
Splinter Cell is the first installment of a series of novels based on the successful video game series. It was written by Raymond Benson under the pseudonym David Michaels. The plot follows Sam Fisher as he investigates a terrorist group called "The Shadows" and a related arms-dealing organization named "The Shop". Members of "The Shop" use inside information to attempt to kill "Third Echelon" members, including Fisher. Shortly after its publication in December 2004, it spent 3 weeks on the New York Times list of bestsellers. It also made it to the list of Wall Street Journal mass-market paperback bestsellers.

Tom Clancy's Splinter Cell: Operation Barracuda (2005)
In Operation Barracuda, which was released on November 1, 2005, and which also made the New York Times bestseller list, Raymond Benson (again as David Michaels) continues the story of the first Splinter Cell novel.

Tom Clancy's Splinter Cell: Checkmate (2006)
For Checkmate, Grant Blackwood took over as author behind the David Michaels pseudonym, Benson having declared that he was "finished with Splinter Cell". Unlike the first two books, Checkmate is not written from the first person perspective of Fisher, nor does Checkmate continue the running subplots that were established in the previous. This novel was released on November 7, 2006.
The book starts off with a ship by the name of Trego sailing towards the American east coast.  Sam Fisher is called in from a training mission to disable the ship.  After Fisher stops the ship from irradiating the American west coast with nuclear waste he is informed that a town by the name of Slipstone has just been radioactively attacked and 5,000+ people are dead.  All these events lead to more questions which eventually leads Fisher to Ukraine, Iran, Dubai, and Ashgabat, Turkmenistan.

Tom Clancy's Splinter Cell: Fallout (2007)
On November 6, 2007, Fallout, was published, Blackwood's second Splinter Cell novel and the fourth in the series. Like the previous novel, it was written by Grant Blackwood, under the pseudonym David Michaels. The story follows Sam Fisher as he combats Islamic fundamentalists who have taken over the government of Kyrgyzstan.

Tom Clancy's Splinter Cell: Conviction (2009)
Conviction, is the tie-in novel to the game with the same name. It was published on November 3, 2009, and was written by Peter Telep under the name David Michaels. It was published by Berkley Books, under Penguin Group. The book follows Sam Fisher after the killing of Lambert. Fisher is on the run and has 'gone rogue.'  He is being chased by a team of rookie Splinter Cells led by Ben Hansen. Tales of treason and betrayal are being heard about Sam throughout the underworld.  He will not let Lambert die in vain as he travels around the world untangling intricate plots of murder, espionage, and international arms dealers.

Tom Clancy's Splinter Cell: Endgame (2009)
Endgame is the second "half" of the Conviction novel. The plot runs parallel to the Conviction novel, but from the point of view of Fisher's antagonists; which begins as he tries to track down a Doppelgänger factory conspiracy. It was published on December 1, 2009.  The story is told from the perspective of Ben Hansen and the rest of the team pursuing Fisher.  The events reveal a plot of international intrigue.

Tom Clancy's Splinter Cell Blacklist: Aftermath (2013)
Published in October 2013, this tie-in novel takes place after the events of the video game Tom Clancy's Splinter Cell: Blacklist. 

"Eccentric billionaire Igor Kasperov owns one of the most influential and successful anti-virus software companies in the world. But when the Kremlin orders him to unleash a catastrophic computer virus against the United States, he is forced to flee for his life. Sam Fisher and Fourth Echelon are charged with finding Kasperov and presenting the American president’s offer for political asylum. Because there are others looking for Kasperov. And the only thing they will offer him is a swift death."

Aftermath is written by Peter Telep and the first in the series to be authored without the use of the David Michaels pseudonym.

Tom Clancy's Splinter Cell: Firewall (2022)
Firewall was released on March 1 for Kindle and on March 15 for paperback. It was written by James Swallow and will feature Sam Fisher's daughter, Sarah, working alongside her father. The plot finds Fisher facing off against an assassin from his past and a sinister threat to global security - a powerful cyberwarfare technology known as Gordian Sword, capable of cutting through any firewall in existence, to be auctioned off to the highest bidder in a rogue’s gallery of terrorists, criminals and renegade states.

Common elements

Plot and themes
The first game explains that "Splinter Cell" refers to an elite recon-type unit of single covert operatives (such as Sam Fisher) who are supported in the field by a high-tech remote team.

In the first three games (Splinter Cell, Pandora Tomorrow, Chaos Theory), terrorists are planning attacks, usually by use of information warfare, which Fisher, an operative for Third Echelon, a secret branch of the NSA, must prevent. The missions range from gathering intelligence to capturing and/or eliminating terrorists.

In the fourth game, Double Agent, Fisher assumes the identity of a wanted criminal in order to infiltrate a terrorist ring.

The fifth game, Conviction, begins immediately after Double Agent. Having abandoned Third Echelon, Fisher discovers that the death of his daughter Sarah had not been an accident (as had been purported at the beginning of Double Agent), leading him to strike out on his own in search of those responsible, until his investigation uncovers a conspiracy within his old agency.

In the sixth and most recent game, Blacklist, Third Echelon has been disbanded by the President of the United States. A new outfit, Fourth Echelon, is formed by the President and placed under the command of Fisher with the mission of stopping the 'Blacklist' attacks and the Engineers, the organization behind them. Blacklist deals with the morality of war and how far Fisher and his team go in order to prevent these plots against America.

Trifocal goggles

A device used for seeing in the dark features strongly in the series. Originally, Tom Clancy had rejected the idea of Fisher having these "trifocal goggles", having stated that such goggles (with both thermal vision and night vision) were impossible to make. The creators argued that having two separate sets of goggles would have made for awkward gameplay and convinced Clancy to allow it. This also gave the Splinter Cell series a recognizable signature, a desirable feature. Chaos Theory added a third one, electromagnetic view, which shows the path of electricity in the area, mainly electrical cables and any device that has electrical power, like TVs, computers, etc. Conviction allows a fourth module to be accessed, a sonar module that can scan through walls for interactable objects, such as weapons, people, and consoles.

The trifocal goggles however, didn't remain completely fictional. In 2004, Northrop Grumman produced and delivered one such device. The device, called Fused Multispectral Weapon Sight (FMWS) was capable of combining thermal and intensified imaging. Later in 2007, ITT Industries developed another such device, designated AN/PSQ-20.

Characters
The characters of the games, as well as the organization "Third Echelon", were created by J. T. Petty. The main recurring ones are:
Sam Fisher is the main protagonist of the series. The character ranks 24th on the "Guinness Top 50 Video Game Characters of All Time" list.
Irving Lambert, leader of "Third Echelon", serves as the player's guide by leading Fisher through the games' missions, until he is killed by Sam in Double Agent.
Anna "Grim" Grimsdóttír is portrayed as an official Third Echelon hacker and analyst, who helps Fisher when technical obstacles need to be overcome. In Conviction she takes over the role of guide from the deceased Lambert; her character also becomes the source of dramatic tension in the story.  In Blacklist, she is the technical operations officer and butts heads with Sam over morality, ethics, and Fourth Echelon's operating parameters.
Sarah Fisher, Sam's daughter and sole family member. She was presumed to be killed in Double Agent, but Conviction revealed her murder to be a deception.

Gameplay
The encouraged way to progress through the games is to remain hidden, select non-obvious routes, and utilize diversions to pass guards. The first game in the series only features a single-player mode, Pandora Tomorrow introduces a two-on-two multiplayer mode. Chaos Theory further develops that mode and introduces a cooperative mode. Cooperative mode plays similarly to the single player mode, but adds situations that can only be overcome as a team. The cooperative storylines in Chaos Theory and the sixth generation version of Double Agent parallel those of Fisher's actions in the single-player modes, letting players act on information he obtained or provide support in the field.

Double Agent introduces a morality factor: Fisher may now encounter conflicting objectives between his superiors and the terrorists. For example, the terrorists may assign a mission to assassinate someone, while the NSA simultaneously instructs the player to prevent the assassination. This creates a delicate balancing act between gaining the trust of the terrorists and fulfilling the mission assignments. In addition, Fisher must not do anything to reveal to the terrorists that he is a double agent (such as let himself be seen with an NSA gadget), otherwise he will lose instantly.

Conviction utilises a much faster and more violent form of stealth action gameplay than previous games in the series. It retains the cooperative multiplayer mode of the two preceding games.
The weapons that Sam Fisher uses are based more accurately on current real-world weapons which behave accordingly and all weapons can be upgraded by a points system. This points system is secondary to the main storyline and is achievement based. These points may be used to add silencers, sights, upgraded ammo, laser targeting and other upgrades, with up to three upgrades per weapon.
This game provides an interactive mission update sequence that is built into the levels themselves. Instead of getting an objective-bar popup, the objective may appear in bold white text on the side of a building or in front of a barricade. This adds to the immersion and keeps the HUD uncluttered. The stealth element of the game allows Fisher to hide in the shadows and become almost invisible. Guards may be assassinated by unsuppressed or silenced weapons, gadgets, or hand-to-hand combat. After successfully completing a hand-to-hand kill, the player is provided with an 'execution' bonus, which allows the player to mark two to four targets (depending on the weapon selected) such as enemies or objects, and trigger the execution animation. Fisher will then dispatch all targets within a few seconds in an extraordinary fashion.
Interactive interrogation cutscenes where Fisher beats up a target for information do not require the player to do anything other than press [Interrogate]. Though if the player happens to be near an interactive object like a television or table, Fisher may use that to alter the standard animation.

Development and history

Origin
Although the series features his name, Tom Clancy had little to no involvement in the development of any of the installments.
According to series producer Mathieu Ferland, the original game was developed so that Ubisoft's Montreal studio could demonstrate its full potential. After Tom Clancy's Rainbow Six and Tom Clancy's Ghost Recon, "special ops was the natural next step" for Clancy-endorsed games.

Graphics and technology
The first game in the series modified the Unreal Engine to allow the light-and-dark-based gameplay style. The other games continued this, using updated versions of the engine.

By the release of the latest game – Blacklist – the engine had been upgraded to the LEAD engine, a heavily modified version of the Unreal Engine 2.5. The game had active shadows on all consoles not simply as a graphical function – as in most games – but as a gameplay enhancer for the sake of the game's stealth features. This meant that more coding for the game was required and overall, required a powerful desktop computer in order to get the best clarity and performance.

Reception
By the end of 2004, sales of the Splinter Cell series totaled 9.6 million units. By October 2005, the series' global sales had surpassed 12.5 million units.

Other media

Film adaptation
Originally announced as a special feature on Splinter Cell: Chaos Theory, a film adaptation for the series was confirmed to be in development, as early as 2005.

In 2011, Ubisoft announced that Tom Clancy's Splinter Cell, Tom Clancy's Ghost Recon, and Assassin's Creed were all planned to receive film adaptations. The company officially stated, "We want to keep ownership, retain control over the film content, and we're open to work with studios on the development of our projects, and eventually collaborate on the pre-casting, pre-budget and script." The following year, it was reported that Warner Bros. and Paramount Pictures are the front-runners bidding to make a Splinter Cell film. By November, it was announced that British actor Tom Hardy was cast as Sam Fisher, while Eric Warren Singer was hired as screenwriter. By 2013, Ubisoft announced that the film will be made by New Regency, with Basil Iwanyk signed on as producer through his production company, Thunder Road Films.

In March 2014, Doug Liman joined the production as director, with Jean-Julien Baronnet and David Bartis attached as producers. Later that month, Sheldon Turner was brought into the production team, to write a new draft of the script. Hardy told Collider in an interview that the studio was hoping to start filming that August. By June that year, Liman stated that both he and Hardy were working on the film's script, which will focus on a young Sam Fisher, in his prime as opposed to the portrayal of a seasoned spy in the video games. In October of the same year, Iwanyk has stated that filming will start in early 2015.

In April 2015, Liman had left as director, with reports that studio were talking with Joseph Kahn as his replacement. By July, Ubisoft hired Frank John Hughes to rewrite the film's script. In January 2017, Iwanyk confirmed that the script had been completed and sent to Hardy to read over. The producer explained that the film is intended to have its own style within the action movie genre, and that the production team is aiming to make an "edgy" PG-13 rated film.

Anime series adaptation
In late July 2020, streaming service company Netflix announced that an anime series adaptation is in the works. John Wick writer Derek Kolstad will be serving as executive producer on the series, while the animation will be created by Sun Creature and Fost.

References

External links

 

 
Fictional military organizations
Ubisoft franchises
Tom Clancy games
Stealth video games by series
Action-adventure video games by series
Video game franchises
Video games adapted into comics
Video games adapted into television shows
Game Developers Choice Award winners